The 2010–11 División de Honor was the 44th season of the top flight of the Spanish domestic rugby union competitions since 1953, played between September 2010 and March 2011. CR La Vila, who were runners-up the previous season, won their first ever league championship after they finished top of the table by a single point.

Teams

Final standings

Source: Federación Española de Rugby

Scorers statistics

By Tries

By total points

References

External links
Official site

2010–11
  
Spain